In the early months of 2017, parts of South Sudan experienced a famine following several years of instability in the country's food supply caused by war and drought. The famine, largely focused in the northern part of the country, affected an estimated five million people (nearly 50% of the South Sudanese population). In May 2017, the famine was officially declared to have weakened to a state of severe food insecurity.

Background 

South Sudan suffered the 1998 Sudan famine before its independence, but no famine had been formally declared anywhere in the world during the six years prior to 2017. There are currently  warnings of imminent famine in Yemen, Somalia, and the northeastern part of Nigeria, but the formal declaration requires that the following criteria be met:
 20% of households suffer extreme food shortages.
 30% of the population suffers extreme malnutrition.
 At least 1 per each 5,000 inhabitants die per day.

A February 20 update of the Integrated Food Security Phase Classification (IPC) found that 4.9 million South Sudan residents, 40% of the population, were in need of "urgent food, agriculture, and nutrition assistance".  The report had surveyed 23 counties, of which 14 exceeded the emergency action threshold of 15% acute malnutrition. The World Food Programme carried out relief operations throughout the war, mitigating the risk of famine in other areas including the Northern Bahr el Ghazal state.  Bahr el Ghazal had been the region most severely affected in the 1998 famine, when it was struck by a two-year drought, a ban on humanitarian airdrops, restrictions on movement of displaced persons, confiscation of cattle and destruction of food stores.

A 2016 UN report described the former Unity State as the site of continuous fighting throughout the civil war because it has "great economic and symbolic importance because of its vast oil resources and also as a predominantly Nuer state, in a conflict that has pitted the two dominant tribes, Dinkas and Nuers, against each other".  Looting and burning in Unity State and displacement of its inhabitants in fighting over oil reserves also occurred in the Second Sudanese Civil War in the years leading up to the 1998 Sudan famine.  It is estimated that in 1998, 12,000 people starved in the Block 5A area out of 240,000 total, with another 160,000 forcibly displaced.  Instability is a major reason for the low oil production in South Sudan since 2012.

Progression to famine 

In February 2015 the World Food Programme noted the potential for drought in South Sudan and other nearby countries due to the developing El Niño event.  Their report found that South Sudan was "experiencing a very good start to the agricultural season" and suggested it might be an exception to a pessimistic regional prediction for July to September 2015.

In June 2015 the Famine Early Warning Systems Network observed a spike in food prices and an increase in the number of households likely to face catastrophic famine.  These were attributable in part to economic considerations including increasing transport costs, a decrease in the parallel exchange rate of the South Sudanese pound from £6.1 SSP to £11.5 SSP per United States Dollar, and the loss of government credit allowing import of food at the official exchange rate of £2.9 SSP per USD.  At the time 8.8% of households surveyed in Ayod and 1.4% in Mayendit had a household hunger score of 5 or 6, which was below the 20% threshold for regional famine.

By September 2015, Leer County, the home of rebel leader Riek Machar and future epicentre of the famine, had been rendered devoid of cattle and nearly empty of civilians fleeing massacre and the burning of homes and fields; drought contributed in part by lowering crop yields and in part by reducing the length of a traditional pause in fighting for the rainy season.

In January 2016, a WHO report noted that "existing conditions may lead to famine" due to drought in the central and eastern part of the country.

In March 2016, the UN reported that the South Sudan Army was being paid not in money but with a "do what you can and take what you can" policy that allowed them to confiscate cattle and other possessions, and even to rape and murder civilian women as a form of salary.  The report described all sides but especially the South Sudan government SPLA forces and allied militia making targeted attacks on civilians based on ethnicity, systematically destroying towns and villages. It concluded that the pattern of abuses "suggests a deliberate strategy to deprive the civilians living in the area of any form of livelihood or material support."

By August 2016, South Sudan was gripped by an "almost entirely man-made" food crisis attributed more to blockage of food assistance than to drought. At the time nearly 25% of the country's population was in a state of disparity. Sudan is in urgent need of food assistance.

By June 2017, the food crisis had subsided and the UN considered the famine to be over, while still pointing out that 1.7 million people were facing the level of food insecurity just below famine.

As of December 2017, there was an estimated 42% of the South Sudanese population facing severe security conditions, with most of the effected being young people and children.

Effects
On 20 February 2017, the United Nations declared a famine in parts of former Unity State of South Sudan and warned that it could spread rapidly without further action. The World Food Programme reported that 67% of the South Sudanese population (4.9 million people) needed food urgently, and at least 100,000, according to the UN, were in imminent danger of death by starvation.

International humanitarian advocates stated the famine was manmade and pointed to the country's ongoing conflict for creating the famine conditions. More than 3 million people had been displaced by ongoing violence across the country, forcing families to abandon agricultural land and livestock, leaving them with few food resources to survive with. The worst fighting was in Unity State, where tens of thousands of people fled their homes due to a government offensive against opposition-held areas.

A mass humanitarian effort focused on responding to the famine declaration. Still, there were significant challenges for agencies delivering food in famine affected areas. Fighting prevented civilians from reaching food distribution sites. In other cases, civilians reported that food they received was taken by soldiers involved in the fighting. UN officials said President Salva Kiir Mayardit was blocking food deliveries to some areas, though Kiir said on 21 February that the government would allow "unimpeded access" to aid organizations.

In addition, parts of South Sudan did not have rain in two years.  According to United Nations Food and Agriculture Organization Representative Serge Tissot, "Our worst fears have been realised.  Many families have exhausted every means they have to survive.  The people are predominantly farmers and war has disrupted agriculture. They’ve lost their livestock, even their farming tools. For months there has been a total reliance on whatever plants they can find and fish they can catch."

The reports also warned that about 5.5 million people, half of South Sudan's population, were expected to suffer food shortages and insecurity by July 2017. According to Jeremy Hopkins, the South Sudan representative for the UN children's agency, more than 200,000 children were at risk of death from malnutrition in the country.

Responses

Government of South Sudan
Days after the declaration of famine, the government raised the price of a business visa from $100 to $10,000, mostly aimed at aid workers, citing a need to increase government revenue. U.N. officials said that President Salva Kiir Mayardit was blocking food deliveries to some areas.

United Nations
In 2016 several UN agencies and other relief agencies intensified their efforts, setting a new record for post-independence South Sudan by reaching four million people with 265,000 metric tons of food assistance and $13.8 million in cash assistance.  According to the UN Children's Fund Deputy Executive Director and UN Assistant Secretary General Justin Forsyth, "Nobody should be dying of starvation in 2017. There is enough food in the world, we have enough capability in terms of the humanitarian community.  In South Sudan, UNICEF has 620 feeding centres for severely malnourished children, so the places where children are dying are places we can't get to, or get to only occasionally. If there was access, we could save all of these children's lives." Furthermore, UNICEF warned that more than 1 million children in South Sudan are subjected to malnutrition.

European Union
In February 2017 the United Kingdom said that it would issue £100 million sterling in aid to South Sudan in 2017, while the European Union pledged to provide 82 million EUR.

Canada
In March 2017, Canada government announced 37 million CAD in funding for UN agencies and non-governmental humanitarian organizations working to address famine in South Sudan. In June 2017, the Canadian government pledged another, additional, 86 million CAD in funding to assist in the response to South Sudan's famine and conflict.

Ongoing Famine (2018)

Overview 
One year after famine was declared in 2017 in South Sudan, three United Nations agencies warned without sustained humanitarian assistance and access, there could be a danger of severely food insecurity in the coming months; this would threaten more than seven million people in the crisis-torn country---almost two-thirds of the South Sudanese population. Namely, in January 2018, there was a 40 percent increase in the number of severely food insecure people, compared to a year ago in 2017. According to an Integrated Food Security Phase Classification report, a total of 5.3 million people---nearly half the population--- were struggling to find enough food each day and in “crisis” or “emergency” levels of food insecurity.

Effects 
1.2 million children under five years of age severely malnourished. Increases in acute malnutrition are due to serious food insecurity, widespread conflict and displacement, poor access to services, high morbidity, extremely poor diets, and poor sanitation and hygiene. In the former counties of Renk, Nyirol, Duk, Twic East and Pibor (Greater Upper Nile region) during the March–May period, Global Acute Malnutrition rates were over 20 percent, which was above WHO's 15-percent emergency threshold.

The period of the lean season between May and July and the ongoing conflicts continuously worsened the famine. Members of a working group including South Sudanese and UN officials called this year "the toughest year on record.” By September, relentless conflicts and the lean season pushed 6.1 million people - nearly 60 percent of the population – into extreme hunger. “More than 6 million lives shattered by hunger are just too many,” said Pierre Gauthier, FAO's Acting Representative in South Sudan. “Assessment after assessment, we find that conflict is the main driver of this desperate situation, making it impossible for farmers to get back on their feet. We are reaching as many people as we can, in almost every county, but it is critical to end the conflict and sustain peace to prevent an already severe food insecurity situation from deteriorating even further. This IPC demonstrates clearly that if the people of South Sudan have peace, they will be able to improve their own resilience and food security situation.”

Responses (2018)

United Nations
Many UN officials believed that man-made conflicts caused the high levels of widespread hunger across the country. The Food and Agriculture Organization of the United Nations (FAO), the United Nations Children's Fund (UNICEF) and World Food Programme (WFP), therefore, called for a sustainable peace across the country, and unhindered, safe access to all areas where people who survived the fighting but are left with nothing, and need life-saving assistance. In addition, these three UN organizations offered assistance to address the food crisis through various strategies.

The Food and Agriculture Organization of the United Nations (FAO) 
FAO attempted to restore the country's agriculture sector by supporting the farmers with seeds and tools. By the end of September, FAO already distributed over 4,800 tons of crop seeds to approximately 1.4 million farmers. Because many South Sudanese relied on their livestocks to survive, FAO also subsidized the fishermen and pastoralists, including providing essential animal health services to protect livestocks.

The United Nations Children's Fund (UNICEF) 
Since the beginning of 2018, numerous outpatient treatment programmes (OTP) and stabilization centers established by the UNICEF admitted 147,421 children who suffered from severe acute malnutrition. This number represents 69% of the 215,312 target for 2018 and 55% of the 269,140 Severe Acute Malnutrition caseload for this year. 89% of these children fully recovered from this devastating epidemic.

World Food Programme 
World Food Programme (WFP), the food-assistance branch of the United Nations and the world's largest humanitarian organization addressing hunger and promoting food security, resumed the integrated rapid response mechanism (IRRM).

As of January 2018, WFP already sent seven teams in Bilkey, Nyandit, Kurwai, Jaibor, Chuil, Buot and Ulang, providing life-saving food and nutrition assistance to around 96,633 people, including 17,370 children under the age of five. Moreover, WFP plans to deploy an additional 26 missions in February and March, targeting close to 400,000. In addition to providing immediate services, the IRRM establishes a framework of humanitarian access, which enables partners to establish longer-term presence in disaster-affected locations.

WFP aided the population with life-saving emergency food supplies, food in return for work to construct and rehabilitate community assets, and food for school meals. It also provided special medications for the prevention and treatment of malnutrition in children, and pregnant and nursing women. So far in 2018, WFP had distributed 30,000 tons of food and utilized US$2.9 million in cash-based transfers to help more than 3.1 million South Sudanese people.

WFP Executive Director David Beasley warned in December 2019 that South Sudan's food security situation was in "trouble, serious trouble" after flooding and conflicts, and that immediate action was needed to stave off famine in 2020.

OXFAM 
Oxfam is a confederation of 20 independent charitable organizations focusing on the alleviation of global poverty, founded in 1942 and led by Oxfam International. It is a major nonprofit group with an extensive collection of operations. Oxfam is on the ground racing to get food, water and hygiene items to the most vulnerable people in the region of Sudan, South Sudan, Uganda, and Ethiopia. It is providing regular emergency food distributions, clean water, safe sanitation facilities, and essential hygiene items to help keep diseases at bay. Also, it is supporting people to produce food and make a living for themselves. Specifically, they train people on improving their farming methods and deliver assets like livestock, tools, seeds, and fishing gear. Likewise, they distribute cash and vouchers to families for use in markets. Lastly, they support traders to build better links between communities.

See also
 2017 Somalian drought
 Famine in Yemen
 1998 Sudan famine
 1993 Sudan famine

Notes

References 

Famine
Famine 2017
South Sudan 2017
South Sudan Famine
Famine 2017
21st-century famines